Reproductive coercion (also called coerced reproduction, reproductive control or reproductive abuse) is a collection of behaviors that interfere with decision-making related to reproductive health. These behaviors are meant to maintain power and control related to reproductive health by a current, former, or hopeful intimate or romantic partner, but they can also be perpetrated by parents or in-laws. Coercive behaviors infringe on individuals' reproductive rights and reduce their reproductive autonomy. 

There are three forms of reproductive coercion, including pregnancy coercion, birth control sabotage, and controlling the outcome of a pregnancy. 

Reproductive coercion and intimate partner violence are strongly correlated; however, reproductive coercion can occur in relationships in which physical and sexual violence are not reported. Reproductive coercion and unintended pregnancy are strongly associated, and this association is stronger in individuals who have experienced intimate partner violence. While research remains fragmentary, women in abusive relationships are at higher risk of reproductive coercion and unintended pregnancies. Reproductive coercion is considered a serious public health issue.

Forms

Pregnancy coercion 
Pregnancy coercion includes any behaviors intended to coerce or pressure a partner to become or not become pregnant, or to coerce or pressure a partner to impregnate them. Pregnancy coercion involves various tactics, including verbal threats related to impregnation, coerced sex, refusal to use or interference with male-controlled contraception (i.e., condoms, withdrawal), interference with or pressure not to use female controlled contraception (i.e., hormonal methods), monitoring menstrual cycles or gynecological visits, pressure for or against sterilization, and monitoring of ovulation. Threatened or completed physical violence may also be perpetrated against a partner to coerce them to become pregnant or coerce a partner to impregnate them.

Birth control sabotage
Birth control sabotage involves tampering with contraception or interfering with the use of contraception. Birth control sabotage includes removing a condom after agreeing to wear one (also called stealthing), damaging a condom, removing or lying about the use of contraception (including vaginal rings, intrauterine devices (IUDs), and contraceptive patches), or throwing away (or simply lying about the consumption of) oral contraceptive pills. Other methods of birth control sabotage include preventing a partner from obtaining or refilling contraceptive prescriptions, refusing to wear a condom, stating that a condom is being worn when one is not, not withdrawing after agreeing to do so, exaggerating the risks of hormonal contraceptives, not informing a partner after ceasing the use of female-controlled contraception or removing contraceptive devices, and not telling a partner if a condom broke or fell off.

Gender and sexual power dynamics and coercion associated with sexual power dynamics are both linked to condom nonuse.  Even women with high sexually transmitted infection knowledge are more likely to use condoms inconsistently than women with low STI knowledge when there is a high level of fear for abuse.

Controlling the outcome of a pregnancy 
Controlling the outcome of a pregnancy is an attempt to influence a partner to continue or terminate a pregnancy. This can include abortion coercion, or pressuring, threatening, or forcing a partner to have an abortion or not. A Guttmacher Institute policy analysis states that forcing a woman to terminate a pregnancy she wants or to continue a pregnancy she does not want violates the basic human right of reproductive health.

Prevalence

United States
Reproductive coercion in October 2018 was reported by 5-14% of women in family planning clinic settings and lifetime experience has been reported by 8-30% of women in a range of settings in the US.

The US Centers for Disease Control and Prevention's survey on domestic violence includes questions regarding control of reproductive health, specifically pregnancy pressure and birth control sabotage. The 2011 study found that:

 approximately 8.6% (or an estimated 10.3 million) of women in the United States reported ever having an intimate partner who tried to get them pregnant when they did not want to, or refused to use a condom, with 4.8% having had an intimate partner who tried to get them pregnant when they did not want to, and 6.7% having had an intimate partner who refused to wear a condom;  
 approximately 10.4% (or an estimated 11.7 million) of men in the United States reported ever having an intimate partner who tried to get pregnant when they did not want to or tried to stop them from using birth control, with 8.7% having had an intimate partner who tried to get pregnant when they did not want to or tried to stop them from using birth control and 3.8% having had an intimate partner who refused to wear a condom.

In a sample of urban women aged 18-44, 16% reported experiencing reproductive coercion. In a family planning clinic setting in California, 13% of patients reported experiencing reproductive coercion in October 2018. Among California girls aged 14-19 seeking school-based health services, 12.4% reported experiencing reproductive coercion. Among women aged 16-29 seeking family planning in California, 19.1% reported experiencing pregnancy coercion in their lifetime. 15.0% of women in California, aged 16-29, seeking family planning reported experiencing birth control sabotage. In a sample of college-aged women in the northeastern United States, 8% reported experiencing reproductive coercion in their lifetime; 3.9% reported experiencing birth control sabotage in their lifetime, and 6.8% reported experiencing pregnancy coercion in their lifetime. In a Texas sample, 1% of non-pregnant women aged 16-40 reported experiencing pregnancy coercion in their lifetime. Among Pennsylvania family planning clinic patients, reproductive coercion was reported at 5% in October 2018. In a sample of adolescents aged 14-20 in Boston, 20% had been coerced into having sex without a condom.

Among women seeking an abortion in the United States, between 0.1% and 2.0% are coerced to have an abortion by an intimate partner. Furthermore, one study of males between the age of 18-35 who had ever had sex found that 4.1% had attempted to compel a partner to have an abortion and 8.0% attempted to prevent a partner from having an abortion.

Teenage girls in physically violent relationships are 3.5 times more likely to become pregnant and are 2.8 times more likely to fear the possible consequences of negotiating condom use than non-abused girls. They are also half as likely to use condoms consistently compared to non-abused girls, and teenage boys perpetrating dating violence are also less likely to use condoms. Teenage mothers are nearly twice as likely to have a repeat pregnancy within 2 years if they experienced abuse within three months after delivery. 26% of abused teenage girls reported that their boyfriends were trying to get them pregnant.

Other countries

In Bangladesh, 10% of married women experiencing intimate partner violence reported that their male partner disagreed with them about using contraception. Additionally, 10.4% of women who did not report intimate partner violence reported that their male partner disagreed with them about using contraception.

Among women seeking abortions in Northern China, 2.1% reported that they were being forced to have an abortion by their partner.

Among women in Cote d'Ivoire over the age of 18 with a male partner, lifetime prevalence rates of reproductive coercion perpetrated by an in-law of 5.5% and 6.0% have been reported. Lifetime prevalence of reproductive coercion among women in Cote d'Ivoire over the age of 18 perpetrated by a male partner is 18.5%. Reproductive coercion by in-laws was reported by 15.9% of women who were maltreated by their in-laws, versus 2.8% who were not maltreated. Additionally, reproductive coercion by in-laws was reported by 16.3% of women who experienced physical violence by their in-laws, versus 5.9% who did not report violence.

Among women who had abortions in Italy, 2% of those who did not experience intimate partner violence, 7% who experienced psychological violence, and 13% who experienced physical or sexual violence stated that they become pregnant because their partner wanted them to be pregnant. Furthermore, 4.5% of those who did not experience intimate partner violence, 3.6% who experienced psychological violence, and 21.7% who experienced physical or sexual violence stated they had an abortion because their partner wanted a child but they did not.

Among married women aged 15-49 in Jordan, 13% reported that a parent or in-law tried to stop them from using contraception, including their mother-in-law (36%), mother (27%), or sister-in-law (11%). Furthermore, 11% reported that their husband refused to use contraception or tried to stop them from using contraception, and 89% reported their husband had expressed disapproval of contraception. In total, 20% of ever-married Jordanian women report that their husband or someone else has interfered with their attempts to prevent pregnancy.

In Nigeria, coercion by husband was more commonly a reason for IUD removal in younger women (74.2%) than older women (25.8%), and in less educated women (46.7%) than more educated women (33.3%).

In India, a study conducted in the state of Uttar Pradesh reported that about 1 out of 8 women (12%)  were subjected to Reproductive Coercion by their current husbands or in-laws. Additionally, 36% of the women facing Reproductive Coercion reported that their current pregnancy was unintended.

Clinical practice and unintended pregnancy prevention 
The American College of Obstetricians and Gynecologists recommends that physicians should screen patients for reproductive coercion periodically, including at annual examinations, during prenatal and postpartum care, and at new patient visits. According to the American College of Obstetricians and Gynecologists and Futures Without Violence recommendations, providers should assess for reproductive coercion as part of routine family planning care and before discussing contraceptive options.

Suggested screening questions in health settings for assessing potential reproductive coercion include:

 Has a current or former partner not let you use birth control, destroyed your birth control, or refused to wear a condom?
 Has your partner ever tried to get you pregnant when you didn't want to be?
 Has your partner ever forced you to have an abortion or caused you to have a miscarriage?
 Does your partner support your decision about when or if you want to become pregnant?
 Do you and your partner agree on what you should do about your pregnancy?

Family planning clinicians can use strategies to help prevent adverse reproductive health outcomes among women who experience reproductive coercion. Strategies include educating patients on the reproductive health impacts of reproductive coercion, counseling on harm reduction strategies, preventing unintended pregnancies by offering discrete, effective birth control methods that may not be detectable by a partner (such as IUDs, emergency contraception, contraceptive implants, or contraceptive injections), and assessing their patient's safety prior to notifying partners about sexually transmitted infections. Interventions that provide awareness of reproductive coercion and provide harm reduction strategies to address reproductive coercion have been found to reduce pregnancy coercion by 71% among women experiencing intimate partner violence.

Emergency contraception can be used after sex without contraception in order to prevent an unwanted pregnancy. In the United States, levonorgestrel (LNG) Plan B One Step and other generics (the morning after pill or emergency contraception) can be acquired by persons of any age. When taken within 72 hours of sex without contraception, Plan B and generics can help prevent an unwanted pregnancy. Other options for emergency contraception in the United States include ulipristal acetate (available with a prescription) taken within 5 days of sex without contraception, and the insertion of a copper IUD within 5 days of sex without contraception.

See also 

Birth control 
Contraceptive security 
Domestic violence and pregnancy 
Forced marriage
Forced pregnancy
Forced abortion
Paternity fraud
Pharmaceutical fraud
Pregnancy from rape
Reproductive rights
Sperm theft
Teen dating violence
Teenage pregnancy
Timeline of reproductive rights legislation

References

External links 
National Domestic Violence Hotline
Futures Without Violence
Houston Area Women's Center